The 2020–21 Boston University Terriers Men's ice hockey season was the 93rd season of play for the program and the 37th season in the Hockey East conference. The Terriers represented Boston University and were coached by Albie O'Connell, in his 3rd season.

Season
As a result of the ongoing COVID-19 pandemic the entire college ice hockey season was delayed. Because the NCAA had previously announced that all winter sports athletes would retain whatever eligibility they possessed through at least the following year, none of Boston University's players would lose a season of play. However, the NCAA also approved a change in its transfer regulations that would allow players to transfer and play immediately rather than having to sit out a season, as the rules previously required.

Due to COVID-19, the start to BU's season was delayed until even later than most schools. The Terriers weren't able to play their first game until January 8, but once they did make it onto the ice, Boston University performed very well. The Terriers won 9 out of 11 games and shot up the Hockey East standings despite playing much fewer games than their colleagues. As the team progressed BU was also hit by the injury bug. Ty Amonte, who missed the entire previous season due to an injury, was lost after just 2 games. During the season two of the team's top players, Drew Commesso and David Farrance, both were lost for several games but BU continued to find a way to win.

Further cancellations and delays limited the team to just 14 games in the regular season. In spite of their limited schedule, BU finished the season second place in Hockey East and was ranked in the middle of the top-20. The program was all but guaranteed a berth into the NCAA Tournament with their 10–3–1 record, which proved fortunate as the team lost its opening game in the conference quarterfinals. The Terriers were rather lackluster in the playoff match, recording just 17 shots on goal for the game and losing 1–2.

As predicted, Boston University was selected for the tournament. They were given the 3-seed in the Northeast region and set to face St. Cloud State in the opening round. BU managed to kill off a 5-minute major in the first period to keep the game scoreless and then opened the second with a goal after just 8 seconds. The Huskies responded with two goals in rapid succession but Boston University tied the game less than two minutes later. St. Cloud got a second lead before the period was out and the two entered the final frame with both still very much in contention. Despite a push by the Terriers, the team was unable to get any of their 16 shots into the net while St. Cloud State scored three more times and ended with a 6–2 victory over BU.

John Copeland sat out the season.

Departures

Recruiting

Roster
As of February 12, 2021.

|}

Standings

Schedule and Results

|-
!colspan=12 style=";" | Regular season

|-
!colspan=12 style=";" | 

|-
!colspan=12 ! style=""; |

Scoring statistics

Goaltending statistics

Rankings

USCHO did not release a poll in week 20.

Awards and honors

Players drafted into the NHL

2021 NHL Entry Draft

† incoming freshman

References

2020-21
2020–21 Hockey East men's ice hockey season
2020–21 NCAA Division I men's ice hockey by team
2020–21 in American ice hockey by team
Boston University Terriers men's ice hockey
Boston University Terriers men's ice hockey
Boston University Terriers men's ice hockey
Boston University Terriers men's ice hockey